True crime is a nonfiction literary, podcast, and film genre in which the author examines a crime and details the actions of people associated with and affected by criminal events.

The crimes most commonly include murder; about 40 percent focus on tales of serial killers. True crime comes in many forms, such as books, films, podcasts, and television shows. Many works in this genre recount high-profile, sensational crimes such as the JonBenét Ramsey killing, the O. J. Simpson murder case, and the Pamela Smart murder, while others are devoted to more obscure slayings.

True crime works can impact the crimes they cover and the audience who consumes it. The genre is often criticized for being insensitive to the victims and their families and is described by some as trash culture.

History

Zhang Yingyu's The Book of Swindles is a late Ming dynasty collection of stories about allegedly true cases of fraud. Works in the related Chinese genre of court case fiction (gong'an xiaoshuo), such as the 16th-century Cases of Magistrate Bao, were either inspired by historical events or else purely fictional.
 
Hundreds of pamphlets, broadsides, chapbooks and other street literature about murders and other crimes were published from 1550 to 1700 in Britain as literacy increased and cheap new printing methods became widespread. They varied in style: some were sensational, while others conveyed a moral message. Most were purchased by the "artisan class and above", as the lower classes did not have the money or time to read them. Ballads were also created, the verses of which were posted on walls around towns, that were told from the perpetrator's point of view in an attempt to understand the psychological motivations of the crime. Such pamphlets remained in circulation in the 19th century in Britain and the United States, even after widespread crime journalism was introduced via the penny press.

In 1807, Henry Tufts published A Narrative of the Life, Adventures, Travels and Sufferings of Henry Tufts, which is likely the first extensive biography of an American criminal. Thomas De Quincey published the essay "On Murder Considered as One of the Fine Arts" in Blackwood's Magazine in 1827, which focused not on the murder or the murderer but on how society views crime.

Starting in 1889, Scottish lawyer William Roughead wrote and published essays for six decades about notable British murder trials he attended, with many of these essays collected in the 2000 book Classic Crimes. Many regard Roughead "as the dean of the modern true crime genre."

An American pioneer of the genre was Edmund Pearson, who was influenced in his style of writing about crime by De Quincey. Pearson published a series of books of this type starting with Studies in Murder in 1924 and concluding with More Studies in Murder in 1936. Before being collected in his books, Pearson's true crime stories typically appeared in magazines like Liberty, The New Yorker, and Vanity Fair. Inclusion in these high-class magazines distinguished Pearson's crime narratives from those found in the penny press. The foreword of a 1964 anthology of Pearson's stories contains an early mention of the term "true crime" as a genre.

Truman Capote's "non-fiction novel" In Cold Blood (1965) is usually credited with establishing the modern novelistic style of the genre and the one that rocketed it to great profitability.

Forms

Magazines 
The first true crime magazine, True Detective, was published in 1924. It featured fairly matter-of-fact accounts of crimes and how they were solved. During the genre's heyday, before WWII, 200 different true crime magazines were sold on newsstands, with six million magazines sold every month. By itself, True Detective had two million in circulation. The covers of the magazines generally featured women being menaced in some way by a potential criminal perpetrator, with the scenarios being more intense in the 1960s.

Public interest in the magazines began declining in the 1970's, and by 1996, almost none were being published, including True Detective, which had been bought and shut down by a new owner.

Books 
True crime books often center on sensational, shocking, or strange events, particularly murder. Even though murder makes up less than 20% of reported crime, it is present in most true crime stories. Typically, these books report on a crime from the beginning of its investigation to its legal proceedings. Serial killers have been a highly profitable sub-genre. An informal survey conducted by Publishers Weekly in 1993 concluded that the more popular true crime books focus on serial killers, with the more gruesome and grotesque content performing even better.

Some true crime works are "instant books" produced quickly to capitalize on popular demand; these have been described as "more than formulaic" and hyper-conventional. Others may reflect years of thoughtful research and inquiry and may have considerable literary merit.

A milestone of the genre was Norman Mailer's The Executioner's Song (1979), which was the first book in the genre to win a Pulitzer Prize.

Other prominent true crime accounts include Truman Capote's In Cold Blood; the best-selling true crime book of all time, Helter Skelter, by the lead Manson family prosecutor Vincent Bugliosi and Curt Gentry; and Ann Rule's The Stranger Beside Me, about Ted Bundy. An example of a modern true crime book is I'll Be Gone in the Dark by Michelle McNamara. Erik Larson's The Devil in the White City gives a novelistic account of H. H. Holmes' operations during the 1893 World's Fair.

In 2006, Associated Content stated that since the start of the 21st century, the genre of writing that was growing the quickest was true crime. Much of this is due to the ease of recycling materials and the publication of numerous volumes by the same authors differing only by minor updates. The majority of readers of true crime books are women.

Films and television 
True crime documentaries have been a growing medium in the last several decades. One of the most influential documentaries in this process was The Thin Blue Line, directed by Errol Morris. This documentary, among others, feature reenactments, although other documentary filmmakers choose not to use them since they don't show the truth. Other prominent documentaries include Paradise Lost: The Child Murders at Robin Hood Hills, Making a Murderer, The Jinx, and The Keepers.

In the early 1990s, a boom of true crime films began in Hong Kong. These films ranged from graphic Category III–rated films such as The Untold Story and Dr. Lamb (based on serial killers Wong Chi Hang and Lam Kor-wan, respectively) to more general audience fare such as the film Crime Story (based on the kidnapping of businessman Teddy Wang Tei-huei), which featured action star Jackie Chan.

Netflix 
Netflix has become one of the most influential streaming services in regard to their True Crime selection. The Netflix show Making a Murderer did so well, the company decided to establish more true crime and expand on this genre making a profit off of the interest from the viewers. Netflix has a number of key search words or tags to help users find true crime programs on their website because the genre has become so popular in the past few years. The way Netflix uses storytelling to explain the case is appealing to many viewers and creates an intimate relationship between the audience and the case itself. These programs often leave the viewer with the job to make a decision on justifications, sentencing, or in cases of unsolved true crime; who they believe did it. Algorithms are used not only to see what a specific user is watching, but also what is being watched world wide and what is sparking conversation. It is obvious that if this algorithm picks up on popularity, Netflix will continue to push out true crime material.

Many of the True Crime documentaries or docuseries have Twitter pages that promote their show's hashtags and reply to fans and/or their theories about the case. Part of the reason viewers love watching true crime, especially on something so available as Netflix, is because after they form their opinions they are able to easily find places to discuss it online and share their opinions. This gains more attention online and leads more people to watching what is being spoken about online. However, this has caused some problems in the past with viewers feeling so strongly about this topic that there have been lawsuits of defamation against Netflix.

Podcasts 
Podcasts with a true crime theme are a recent trend. The 2014 true crime podcast Serial broke podcasting records when it achieved 5 million downloads on iTunes quicker than any previous podcast. As of September 2018, it has been downloaded more than 340 million times. It has been followed by other true crime podcasts such as Dirty John, My Favorite Murder, Up and Vanished, Parcast series such as Cults, Female Criminals and Mind's Eye, Someone Knows Something, and many more.

Podcasts have now expanded to more sites such as Spotify, Apple Music, YouTube and several others. They exist to provide others an easy way to learn about true crime murders and mysteries. Spotify has an expanding number of true crime podcasts with Rotten Mango, Conviction American Panic, Bed of Lies, Catch & Kill among many more. This genre has been on the rise as psychologist, Amanda Vicary, said her report found “women were most drawn to true crime stories that gave them tips for spotting danger and staying alive”.The True Crime category in Apple Podcasts appeared for the first time mid-2019, and until then the podcasts that would be moved into the section had existed across many other categories, such as History, News & Politics, and even Comedy.

It has been speculated that fear could play a role in the popularity of true crime podcasts. These podcasts often recount horrific crimes, which triggers the fear response and the release of adrenaline in the body. Due to the possibility of bingeing podcasts, adrenaline rushes can be experienced in quick bursts. Another explanation for the popularity of true crime podcasts is due to the serialized nature of crime, in which events happen one after another. Podcasts that explore a crime episodically can utilize this aspect in their storytelling. Another strength of these podcasts is use of typical sensationalist techniques, such as inclusion of direct dialogue and focus on victims and their families. Podcasts can use music or other sound cues to maximize the intended impact or shock value of a fact, as seen in Serial.

Trends in the US

In the U.S. women are predominantly the consumers of digital true crime podcasts, in 2019 making up around 73% of the content audience. The 2019 Edison Research Report found that at the time of data collection, an estimated 90 million of the U.S. population older than 12 had listened to a podcast in the last month, and of those polled, around 28% were interested in true crime as a topic to listen to in a podcast.

In 2020, true crime podcasts held many of the U.S. top 50 spots for popularity by most listens, with Crime Junkie at #3, My Favorite Murder at #5, and others scattered amongst the top 50, such as; Serial at #13, Dateline NBC at #22, and Criminal at #30. In that year, true crime ranked third overall for genres by listen behind both comedy and news. From November 2019 through May 2022, true crime podcast listening has increased the most of the top three genres by percentage gain in listeners, with a 66% gain (from ~12.9m to ~21.5m) in current listeners, versus the 44% and 37% gain in listeners by comedy and news respectively.

On Apple Podcasts, True Crime podcasts make up just less than half a percent of the total number of podcasts on the platform. On a collated list of 432 podcasts from the most-visited results of a search for 'Top Podcasts of 2021', true crime podcasts made up more than 20% of the podcasts constituting the lists.

Trends in Australia

In 2017, as many as 30% of podcast listeners had listened to true crime podcasts, and in 2019, this had increased to up to 44%.

Effects 

The investigative process of the true crime genre can lead to changes in the cases being covered, such as when Robert Durst seemingly confessed to murder in the documentary The Jinx and was arrested.

A study conducted in 2011, in Nebraska, showed that consuming non-fiction crime shows (aka true crime) is correlated with an increased fear of being a victim of crime. As the frequency of watching true crime shows increased, support for the death penalty increased, while support for the criminal justice system decreased.

In Australia, the amount of reports given to the crime reporting network Crime Stoppers Australia that led to charges being pressed doubled from 2012 to 2017. This increased interest in crime is attributed to popular true crime podcasts.

The Netflix show Making A Murderer has had a range of real-life effects, ranging from the show being shown in law schools as instructional material to increased mistrust in criminal investigators.

Criticism 
The true crime genre has been criticized as being disrespectful to crime victims and their families. Author Jack Miles believes this genre has a high potential to cause harm and mental trauma to the real people involved. True crime media can be produced without the consent of the victim's family, which can lead to them being re-traumatized. Recent discussions about the consumption of true crime media have also focused on the impact on the audience's mental health.

Depending on the writer, true crime can adhere strictly to well-established facts in journalistic fashion or can be highly speculative. Writers can selectively choose which information to present and which to leave out in order to support their narrative. Artists have offered fact-based narratives blending fiction and historical reenactment. Author Christiana Gregoriou analyzed several books of the genre and concluded that tabloidization and fictionalization are pervasive in the works of some of the authors of true crime literature. In some cases, even books by the same author disagree on specifics about the same killer or events. For instance, some facts reported in Capote's In Cold Blood were challenged in 2013. Capote's second attempt at a true crime book, Handcarved Coffins (1979), despite being subtitled "Nonfiction Account of an American Crime", was already noted for containing significant fictional elements.

References

 
 True crime
Non-fiction crime writers
Non-fiction genres